In applied mathematics, the Kelvin functions berν(x) and beiν(x) are the real and imaginary parts, respectively, of

Similarly, the functions kerν(x) and keiν(x) are the real and imaginary parts, respectively, of

 

where  is the νth order modified Bessel function of the second kind.

These functions are named after William Thomson, 1st Baron Kelvin.

While the Kelvin functions are defined as the real and imaginary parts of Bessel functions with x taken to be real, the functions can be analytically continued for complex arguments  With the exception of bern(x) and bein(x) for integral n, the Kelvin functions have a branch point at x = 0.

ber(x) 

For integers n, bern(x) has the series expansion

where  is the gamma function. The special case ber0(x), commonly denoted as just ber(x), has the series expansion

and asymptotic series

,

where

bei(x) 

For integers n, bein(x) has the series expansion

The special case bei0(x), commonly denoted as just bei(x), has the series expansion

and asymptotic series

ker(x) 

For integers n, kern(x) has the (complicated) series expansion

The special case ker0(x), commonly denoted as just ker(x), has the series expansion

and the asymptotic series

where

kei(x) 

For integer n, kein(x) has the series expansion

The special case kei0(x), commonly denoted as just kei(x), has the series expansion

and the asymptotic series

where β, f2(x), and g2(x) are defined as for ker(x).

See also 
 Bessel function

References

External links 
 Weisstein, Eric W. "Kelvin Functions." From MathWorld—A Wolfram Web Resource. 
 GPL-licensed C/C++ source code for calculating Kelvin functions at codecogs.com: 

Special hypergeometric functions
Functions